The British School Manila (abbreviated as BSM) is a private, non-profit international school in the Philippines. The school provides British education for children ages 3–18, following an adapted form of a British Curriculum and the IB Diploma. BSM students are prepared for end of Key Stage tests in Primary, GCSEs at 16, the IB Diploma at 18 and for life beyond school and university.

History

The British School Manila was founded in 1976, where it has grown from 2 classrooms and 32 students to over 900 students, representing 40 nationalities.

The school first operated in the old Union Church, then in 1980 moved to Merville, Parañaque. In September 2001, BSM relocated to purpose-built premises in Bonifacio Global City, in Metro Manila, Philippines, next to the International School Manila and the Manila Japanese School.

In 2016 the Senate of the Philippines discussed a case brought against the school regarding a student challenged for plagiarism in 2015. The Philippine Department of Justice determined there was no case to answer. The Philippine Department of Education also investigated and, in 2018, instructed BSM to obtain a new legislative franchise to operate within that academic year. The school, having exceeded all regulatory requirements, was formally recognised as an "Educational Institution of International Character" in Republic Act 11218 in July 2018.

In 2021, the school, working in collaboration with the Philippine Department of Education, was one of the first in the Philippines to be granted permission to start hybrid learning and, subsequently, to return to face-to-face learning.

Campus

With the exception of the Main Building and Learning Resource Centre, all of the other buildings have been named after Philippine locations, people and events (Anilao, Boracay, Cebu, Dinagyang, El Nido, Fiesta, Rizal). The maximum class size is 25 for all years with the exception of Year 12 and Year 13 where the aim for a maximum class size is 18. The average class size is 22 students.

Facilities include an 8-lane 25-meter swimming pool, an on-campus 95x45m field using artificial turf for higher playability for tennis, football, cricket and multi-use, a grass sports field that is 100x50m for rugby, football and athletics, math rooms, well-equipped science laboratories and several multipurpose rooms. It also includes two cafeterias, one for Primary students and one for Senior students.

Creative Arts Centre

BSM's Creative Arts Centre, opened just prior to the covid pandemic, is designed for lessons in the visual and performing arts subjects. The building features four levels, along with a Coffee Bean and Tea Leaf, with the first level consisting of Drama and Dance spaces, the second level hosting Music and the third level containing studios for Art and the kiln. The CAC also incorporates a climbing wall, open air auditorium and Bayanihan, a multi-purpose theatre space and auditorium.

Curriculum

BSM teaches an adapted form of the National Curriculum of England in EYFS and Years 1-9. This is followed in Years 10 & 11 with a  range of Edexcel and Cambridge (I)GCSE courses. In Year 12 and 13 students enter the IB Diploma programme. The school also offers a Service Learning programme and more than 200 After School Activities (ASA) catering for different student interests to explore and develop sporting, creative, academic and artistic interests.

Organisation and leadership

The British School is governed by a board with twelve members, four elected and eight appointed. The BSM Board of Governors is overseen by a five-member Council of Trustees which includes members of the British Embassy and the Australian Embassy. Day to day BSM operations are led by the Head of School, supported by the Chief Operating Officer, the Head of Primary School and Head of Senior School. The Leadership team is responsible for curriculum, teaching and learning, operations, staffing, budgets and facilities.

See also
Philippines–United Kingdom relations
Manila Japanese School
International School Manila

References

British international schools in the Philippines
Cambridge schools in the Philippines
International Baccalaureate schools in the Philippines
International schools in Metro Manila
Education in Bonifacio Global City
Educational institutions established in 1976
1976 establishments in the Philippines